Walter Lee Zachary Jr. (born December 18, 1946) is a  former Republican member of the North Carolina House of Representatives. He represented the 73rd district (including all of Yadkin County and portions of Forsyth County) from 2015 to 2023.

Committee assignments

2021-2022 Session
Education - Community Colleges 
Education - Universities 
Ethics 
Finance 
Judiciary III (Chair)
Redistricting 
Alcoholic Beverage Control

2019-2020 Session
Alcoholic Beverage Control 
Education - Universities 
Ethics 
Education - Community Colleges 
Finance 
Judiciary III (Vice Chair)

2017-2018 Session
Agriculture
Alcoholic Beverage Control
Appropriations
Appropriations - Education
Education - Community Colleges
Energy and Public Utilities
Health
Judiciary III (Chair)

2015-2016 Session
Agriculture (Vice-Chair)
Alcoholic Beverage Control
Banking
Finance
Judiciary III
Transportation
Wildlife Resources

Electoral history

2022

2020

2018

2016

2014

References

Living people
21st-century American politicians
Republican Party members of the North Carolina House of Representatives
People from Yadkinville, North Carolina
University of North Carolina at Chapel Hill alumni
1946 births